This is a list of songs recorded by Indian Male playback singer Kailash Kher.

Hindi songs

Kannada songs

Tamil songs

Telugu songs

Bhojpuri

Malayalam

Gujarati

Bengali

Marathi

Oriya

Nepali

Punjabi

Guest appearance

Lyricist

Music director

Solo albums and compilations

Title songs

References

Lists of songs by recording artists
Lists of songs recorded by Indian singers